Lizzy Nkosi is a Swazi politician and the current Minister of Health of Eswatini. In November 2018, King Mswati III announced the formation of his new cabinet and named Nkosi as Minister of Health. She took office on 6 November and succeeded Sibongile Ndlela-Simelane. Nkosi also serves as a Senator.

References

External links
Ministry of Health

 

Living people
Year of birth missing (living people)
Swazi women in politics
Women government ministers of Eswatini